Silver Spring is a Washington Metro and MARC Train station in Montgomery County, Maryland on the Red Line and Brunswick Line. On the Metro, Silver Spring is the first station in Maryland of the eastern end of the Red Line, and is the second-busiest Metro station in Maryland after .

Silver Spring serves the suburb of Silver Spring, and is located east of the intersection between Colesville Road (Route 384) and East-West Highway (Route 410). In addition to rail service, several Metrobus and Ride On bus routes also serve the station at the Paul S. Sarbanes Transit Center, formerly known as the Silver Spring Transit Center.

Silver Spring will be a stop for the Purple Line light rail system, which is currently under construction.

History
Red Line service at Silver Spring began on February 6, 1978. Prior to the opening of Forest Glen Station on September 22, 1990, Silver Spring was the northeastern terminus of the Red Line.

On July 7, 2020, a 7000-series train derailed at low speed on the southbound track as it was leaving the station. There were no injuries. An investigation is underway to determine the cause.

The Purple Line system is under construction as of 2022 and is scheduled to open in 2026.

Bus station
On September 26, 2008, there was a groundbreaking ceremony that took place at the Silver Spring Metro Station, as construction of the Silver Spring Transit Center was about to begin two days later. On September 28, 2008, both the original Silver Spring Metro Station Bus Bay where all WMATA Metrobus, Montgomery County Ride-On, and Shuttle UM Bus Routes originally stopped at, as well as the original Silver Spring Metro Station Kiss & Ride Lot were demolished, in order to make room for the construction of the Silver Spring Transit Center. As a result, all bus route terminals were temporarily rerouted to the side streets near the Silver Spring Metro Station until the Silver Spring Transit Center opened. The facility has 34 bays for Metro, Ride-on Buses, Shuttle-UM, "Kiss and Ride" access, Metrorail, and MARC train service. Its increased capacity is expected to ease the implementation of the Purple Line. The Transit Center will also mark the location for the future northern terminus of the Metropolitan Branch Trail, which heads southbound to Union Station. The transit center is named for former U.S. Senator Paul Sarbanes.

The complex was subject to construction problems and the schedule was extensively delayed.

On March 19, 2013, an engineering firm engaged by Montgomery County to investigate the defects issued a report that indicated "significant and serious design and construction defects, including excessive cracking, missing post-tensioning cables, inadequate reinforcing steel, and concrete of insufficient strength and thickness."

In May 2014, repairs were announced to begin for the summer with the hope of completing them in time to open by early 2015, but after two months they had not resumed.

The facility was transferred from Montgomery County to the Washington Metropolitan Area Transit Authority (WMATA) in August 2015 after the completion of renovations, and opened on September 20, 2015, five years behind schedule.

Station layout
Like Brookland–CUA station, the Red Line island platform at Silver Spring is slightly curved, with convex mirrors located on the inbound side of the platform to aid train operators in making sure the area is clear before closing the doors. The MARC station straddles the Metro station, with a single track and side platform on either side of the Red Line. The MARC platforms are slightly offset from the Metro platform and are connected to each other by a pedestrian bridge. Access between the Red Line and other services is provided via an elevator or escalators from the platform to two ground-level mezzanines, one at the north end of the platform connecting to Colesville Road and one at the center of the platform serving the Transit Center and Metropolitan Branch Trail.

Public art

Penguin Rush Hour
The Silver Spring station is also home to Penguin Rush Hour, a  mural painted by Sally Callmer Thompson, depicting penguins as Metro customers during rush hour. Although originally intended to be a temporary exhibit, the mural placed at the station in the early 1990s has become a symbol of the downtown area of Silver Spring. In 2004, the Silver Spring Regional Center, a county government facility, commissioned the original artist to restore the mural, which was damaged by the elements and missing sections, for approximately $30,000. In 2004-2005, the mural was removed for the restoration, with the promise that it would be returned by the end of 2005. Subsequently, the county decided to postpone re-installation of the mural until completion of the new transit center. In March 2017 a digital copy of the mural, printed on aluminum sheets for durability, was installed at the transit center.

References

External links

 Colesville Road entrance from Google Maps Street View
 Photos of construction of the Paul S. Sarbanes Transit Center

Brunswick Line
Downtown Silver Spring, Maryland
Purple Line (Maryland)
Railway stations in Montgomery County, Maryland
Stations on the Red Line (Washington Metro)
Washington Metro stations in Maryland
Buildings and structures in Silver Spring, Maryland
MARC Train stations
Bus stations in Maryland
Railway stations in the United States opened in 1978
1978 establishments in Maryland